The Tunisia national junior handball team is the Tunisia national under-20 handball team, nicknamed Les Aigles de Carthage (The Eagles of Carthage or The Carthage Eagles), that represent Tunisia in the international handball competitions and it is Controlled by the Tunisian Handball Federation

History
Tunisia junior handball team has participated in several international junior handball competitions the first appearance was at the African Championship in 1980 in that era only the African Champions was allowed to participate in the World Championship so Tunisia had waited until the year 1997 when the International Handball Federation had expanded to more teams including the African 1st and the runners up, since that time Tunisia qualified to World Championship regularly by dominating the African continent with Egypt.

Tournament record

World Championship
 Champions   Runners up   Third place   Fourth place

Red border color indicates tournament was held on home soil.

African Championship

Team

Squad
2015 Men's Junior World Handball Championship
 Manager:  Mohamed Ali Sghir
 Assistant coach:  Adel Temessek
 Team Assistant:  Mohamed Nacer Sebai
 Physiotherapist:  Nabil Ben Abda
 Team Doctor :  Mourad Zarra

Legend
GK-Goalkeeper, LW-Left Winger, RW-Right Winger, LP-Line Player, BP-Back, LB-Left Back, CB-Center Back, RB-Right Back.

Notable players
Amine Bannour
Abdelhak Ben Salah
Aymen Toumi
Oussama Boughanmi
Oussama Hosni
Wael Jallouz
Mosbah Sanaï
 Mohamed Sfar
Marouan Chouiref

Notable Coaches
 Alain Portes

See also
Tunisia men's national handball team
Tunisia men's national youth handball team
Tunisia women's national junior handball team

Other handball codes
 Tunisia national beach handball team

References

External links
Tunisian Handball 
Tunisian Handball Info 
IHF profile

Handball in Tunisia
Men's national junior handball teams
National sports teams of Tunisia